U.S. Route 30 (US 30) runs east–west across the southern part of Pennsylvania, passing through Pittsburgh and Philadelphia on its way from the West Virginia state line east to the Benjamin Franklin Bridge over the Delaware River into New Jersey. In Pennsylvania, US 30 runs along or near the transcontinental Lincoln Highway, an auto trail which ran from San Francisco, California, to New York City before the U.S. Routes were designated. However, the Lincoln Highway turned northeast at Philadelphia, using present US 1 and its former alignments to cross the Delaware River into Trenton, New Jersey.

Points of interest along the route include the Gettysburg Battlefield, Dutch Wonderland, the Flight 93 National Memorial, Fort Ligonier, Westmoreland Mall, Jennerstown Speedway, Idlewild and Soak Zone, and Independence Mall at Independence National Historical Park.

Route description

West Virginia to Pittsburgh
US 30 enters Pennsylvania from West Virginia in Beaver County, heading east along two-lane undivided Lincoln Highway. The road passes through rural areas and comes to an intersection with Pennsylvania Route 168 (PA 168) south of the borough of Hookstown, where it briefly becomes a divided highway. US 30 continues as an undivided road, turning northeast and then southeast before it comes to a junction with the western terminus of PA 151. The road heads southeast and crosses PA 18 in the community of Harshaville. The route passes through Raccoon Creek State Park, where it turns south and crosses Raccoon Creek. The road leaves the state park and curves to the southeast.

US 30 enters Allegheny County and continues east along Lincoln Highway, reaching the community of Clinton. Here, the route turns to the southeast and comes to an interchange with the PA 576 toll road to the southwest of Pittsburgh International Airport, where the route briefly becomes a divided highway. The road continues southeast and reaches the community of Imperial, where it passes under the Montour Trail. US 30 heads into developed areas, crossing Steubenville Pike, and comes to a partial cloverleaf interchange with the US 22 freeway, where US 30 heads east for a concurrency with US 22 and PA 978 continues southeast. US 22/US 30 run east as a four-lane freeway through suburban areas, coming to a partial cloverleaf interchange with Oakdale Road that serves Hankey Farms. Farther east, the freeway has a westbound exit and eastbound entrance with McKee Road that provides access to the borough of Oakdale to the south. From here, US 22/US 30 turn east-northeast and reach an interchange that connects to Old Steubenville Pike, Bayer Road, and Montour Church Road. The freeway comes to an interchange with I-376, where US 22/US 30 head southeast concurrent with I-376 and PA 60 continues east (south) at-grade along a four-lane divided highway.

I-376/US 22/US 30 head southeast as the four-lane Penn-Lincoln Parkway, reaching an interchange with Ridge Road. The freeway comes to a westbound exit and eastbound entrance with Campbells Run Road, where it widens to six lanes. The highway curves to the east and meets I-79 at an interchange. Past this interchange, I-376/US 22/US 30 narrows to two lanes eastbound and head into the borough of Rosslyn Farms, turning southeast and coming to a westbound exit and eastbound entrance with Rosslyn Road that serves Rosslyn Farms. The freeway crosses into the borough of Carnegie and reaches a bus-only eastbound exit and westbound entrance connecting to the PRT's West Busway before passing over a Pittsburgh and Ohio Central Railroad line. The highway passes over Chartiers Creek and another Pittsburgh and Ohio Central Railroad line as it leaves Carnegie and comes to the PA 50 interchange. I-376/US 22/US 30 narrows to four lanes, passing under a Wheeling and Lake Erie Railway line and curving northeast into the borough of Green Tree. The freeway reaches the PA 121 interchange, where it gains a third westbound lane, and heads east, entering the city of Pittsburgh and coming to a westbound exit and eastbound entrance with Parkway Center Drive. The highway turns north and reaches a westbound exit and eastbound entrance with US 19, where US 19 joins I-376/US 22/US 30 on the Penn-Lincoln Parkway. Within this interchange, the road has an eastbound runaway truck ramp and passes under a ramp carrying both directions of US 19 Truck. The freeway widens to six lanes and passes under a Wheeling and Lake Erie Railway line before reaching an interchange with PA 51, where US 19 Truck joins the Penn-Lincoln Parkway from PA 51 and US 19 splits from the Penn-Lincoln Parkway by heading north along with PA 51. Past this interchange, I-376/US 22/US 30/US 19 Truck narrows to four lanes and passes under Mount Washington in the Fort Pitt Tunnel.

After emerging from the Fort Pitt Tunnel, the freeway passes over Norfolk Southern's Mon Line and PA 837, coming to a westbound exit and eastbound entrance that connects to northbound PA 837. The Penn-Lincoln Parkway heads onto the Fort Pitt Bridge, a double-decker bridge carrying four lanes in each direction, and passes over CSX's Pittsburgh Subdivision railroad line and the Monongahela River as it heads into Downtown Pittsburgh at Point State Park and comes to an interchange with the southern terminus of I-279, where US 19 Truck heads north along I-279 and I-376/US 22/US 30 continue east along the Penn-Lincoln Parkway. The I-279 interchange also includes eastbound exits and westbound entrances with Boulevard of the Allies/Liberty Avenue and Fort Duquesne Boulevard that serve Downtown Pittsburgh. The four-lane freeway heads east-southeast between Downtown Pittsburgh to the north and the Monongahela River to the south, reaching a partial interchange with Stanwix Street with no eastbound exit. The highway heads under the Smithfield Street Bridge and comes to an interchange with Grant Street, where it widens to six lanes. I-376/US 22/US 30 pass under the Panhandle Bridge carrying PRT's Pittsburgh Light Rail line and then the Liberty Bridge before the lanes split as it reaches a westbound ramp to Second Avenue north of the South Tenth Street Bridge and south of the Duquesne University campus.

Past this, the highway continues east between urban areas to the north and the Monongahela River to the south, with the Three Rivers Heritage Trail in the median. The freeway comes to an interchange connecting to PA 885 and Forbes Avenue north of the Birmingham Bridge, at which point the trail leaves the median of the freeway and the river heads further south from the freeway. I-376/US 22/US 30 head southeast, with the Three Rivers Heritage Trail parallel to the south, and reaches a westbound exit and eastbound entrance with PA 885. The highway turns east away from the trail and passes over the Allegheny Valley Railroad's P&W Subdivision line. The freeway comes to an interchange with Beechwood Boulevard before it narrows to four lanes and passes under the southern portion of Squirrel Hill in the Squirrel Hill Tunnel. Past the tunnel, I-376/US 22/US 30 head through wooded areas and pass over Ninemile Run in Frick Park. The highway leaves Pittsburgh as it comes to an interchange with Braddock Avenue that serves the boroughs of Edgewood and Swissvale. The freeway continues east through suburban areas in Edgewood, passing under Norfolk Southern's Pittsburgh Line and the PRT's Martin Luther King Jr. East Busway. I-376/US 22/US 30 turn to the northeast and head through a corner of the borough of Braddock Hills before entering the borough of Wilkinsburg. In Wilkinsburg, the freeway comes to an interchange with the southern terminus of PA 8, where US 30 splits from I-376/US 22 on the Penn-Lincoln Parkway by heading southeast at-grade on Ardmore Boulevard.

Pittsburgh to Breezewood

US 30 follows Ardmore Boulevard, a five-lane divided highway with two eastbound lanes and three westbound lanes, and enters the borough of Forest Hills, running through suburban development as it curves to the south. The road narrows to two westbound lanes before it curves to the southeast. The route turns to the south-southeast and passes through the center of Forest Hills. US 30 gains a third eastbound lane before it skirts the border between the borough of North Braddock to the west and the borough of Chalfant to the east as it comes to an eastbound exit and westbound entrance with Electric Avenue. Past this interchange, the route becomes four-lane undivided Lincoln Highway and heads south, crossing into the borough of East Pittsburgh. The road crosses over Bessemer Avenue on a bridge before it curves southeast and heads onto the George Westinghouse Bridge, where it passes over Braddock Avenue, a Union Railroad line, Norfolk Southern's Pittsburgh Line, Turtle Creek, and Norfolk Southern's Port Perry Branch. After passing over Turtle Creek, US 30 leaves East Pittsburgh, turning into a divided highway and passing over East Pittsburgh McKeesport Boulevard. The route comes to an interchange with Greensburg Pike and becomes undivided before it enters the borough of East McKeesport as Greensburg Avenue. Here, the road turns northeast, curving east and intersecting the northern terminus of PA 148. US 30 runs east-southeast as it leaves East McKeesport and continues along Lincoln Highway. Along this stretch, the route briefly becomes a divided highway at intersections with Luehm Avenue and PA 48.

US 30 enters Westmoreland County in the Laurel Highlands region and continues south along four-lane undivided Lincoln Highway, curving southeast and passing through the community of Stewartsville. The road briefly becomes a divided highway at intersections with Leger Road/Carpenter Lane and Center Highway/Robbins Station Road. The route turns to the east and comes to an eastbound exit and entrance with Main Street in the community of Fairmont before it enters the borough of Irwin. US 30 gains a center left-turn lane before it leaves Irwin and becomes a four-lane divided highway as it comes to the Irwin interchange with the Pennsylvania Turnpike (I-76). Past this interchange, the median turns into a center left-turn lane. US 30 runs along the southern border of the borough of Adamsburg and becomes a divided highway as it reaches an interchange with Edna Road serving Adamsburg. The road becomes five lanes with a center left-turn lane and passes through the community of Lincoln Heights and running along the southern border of the city of Jeannette. Past Jeannette, US 30 curves southeast and turns into a four-lane divided highway, coming to an interchange with the PA 66 toll road. After this interchange, the route briefly widens to six lanes before curving east and becoming a five-lane road with a center left-turn lane, turning into a four-lane divided highway as it passes south of the Greengate Centre shopping center and comes to a bridge over the Southwest Pennsylvania Railroad's Radebaugh Subdivision line. US 30 becomes a freeway that bypasses the city of Greensburg to the south and curves southeast, reaching an eastbound exit and westbound entrance with West Pittsburgh Street. The road enters Greensburg and comes to a partial cloverleaf interchange with PA 136. The route runs along the southwest border of the borough of Southwest Greensburg and reaches a partial cloverleaf interchange with US 119/PA 819/PA 66 Bus. Past this interchange, US 30 passes over the Southwest Pennsylvania Railroad's Greensburg Industrial Track line and the Five Star Trail, at which point it heads through a section of the borough of South Greensburg before it comes to a right-in/right-out interchange with Cedar Street. At this point, the freeway curves northeast, reaching a diamond interchange with Mt. Pleasant Road. The road passes through a section of Greensburg and comes to an eastbound exit and westbound entrance with PA 130. A short distance later, the freeway section ends at westbound exit and eastbound entrance with East Pittsburgh Street to the east of Greensburg.

US 30 heads east as six-lane divided Lincoln Highway and reaches an interchange serving the Westmoreland Mall to the south of the road. The road narrows to four lanes and continues east-southeast. Farther east, the route runs through rural areas with some development, passing to the north of Arnold Palmer Regional Airport as it widens to six lanes and comes to an intersection with PA 981 to the south of the borough of Latrobe. US 30 narrows to four lanes before it reaches a cloverleaf interchange with PA 982 that provides access to Latrobe to the north and the borough of Youngstown to the south. The median of the road widens and the westbound lanes cross the Loyalhanna Creek, at which point the Loyalhanna Creek runs in the median of US 30. The route comes to an intersection with the southern terminus of PA 217. Past this intersection, US 30 winds southeast through a gap in Chestnut Ridge, with the eastbound lanes crossing the Loyalhanna Creek. At this point, the road heads east as a four-lane divided highway with the Loyalhanna Creek parallel to the south, passing to the north of the Idlewild and Soak Zone amusement park. The median widens again and the route intersects the southern terminus of PA 259 in the community of Millbank. US 30 curves south and turns to the east. The road curves southeast and the median narrows, at which point it heads along the southwest border of the borough of Ligonier as a four-lane divided highway. The route crosses PA 711 and passes to the south of Fort Ligonier. US 30 leaves Ligonier and narrows to a two-lane undivided road, intersecting the northern terminus of PA 381. The route passes through the community of Laughlintown and runs along the southern border of the borough of Laurel Mountain. Past the borough of Laurel Mountain, the road ascends Laurel Hill and comes to a westbound runaway truck ramp. Further up the hill, the route reaches a westbound truck brake check station and briefly becomes a divided highway through a sharp turn before it comes to another westbound truck brake check station.

At the summit of Laurel Hill, US 30 enters Somerset County and begins to descend the hill along two-lane undivided Lincoln Highway, passing through a section of Laurel Ridge State Park where it crosses the Laurel Highlands Hiking Trail. After descending the hill, the road runs east-southeast. The route enters the borough of Jennerstown and becomes West Pitt Street. US 30 intersects PA 985 and becomes East Pitt Street. The road leaves Jennerstown and becomes Lincoln Highway again. The route heads through the community of Jenners Crossroads before it has a junction with PA 601 in the community of Ferrellton. US 30 briefly becomes a four-lane divided highway as it comes to an interchange with the US 219 freeway. Past this interchange, the route becomes a two-lane undivided road again and winds southeast. The road runs along the southwest border of the borough of Stoystown and passes under Somerset Street before it reaches an interchange with the northern terminus of PA 281. Past Stoystown, US 30 crosses the Stonycreek River and intersects the southern terminus of PA 403 before it comes to a bridge over CSX's S&C Subdivision railroad line. The route comes to the entrance road to the Flight 93 National Memorial to the south. The road runs through the community of Buckstown and passes north of the borough of Indian Lake before it reaches an intersection with PA 160 in the community of Reels Corner. US 30 continues east-southeast and passes to the north of the Stony Creek Wind Farm before it begins to ascend Allegheny Mountain, winding to the east. Approaching the summit of the mountain, the road comes to an eastbound truck brake check station.

US 30 leaves the Laurel Highlands region as it crosses into Bedford County and reaches the summit of Allegheny Mountain, where it turns north-northeast and begins to descend the mountain. The road makes a hairpin turn to the southeast and winds east, coming to an eastbound truck brake check station as it continues to descend. The route heads east-northeast and enters the borough of Schellsburg, where US 30 becomes Pitt Street and crosses PA 96. Upon leaving Schellsburg, the road becomes Lincoln Highway again and passes north of Shawnee State Park, curving southeast and then east. The route passes under the Pennsylvania Turnpike (I-70/I-76) before intersecting the eastern terminus of PA 31. US 30 heads east-northeast a short distance to the south of the Pennsylvania Turnpike and reaches a junction with the eastern terminus of PA 56 before it curves southeast and crosses the Raystown Branch Juniata River in the community of Wolfsburg. The route runs south and comes to an intersection with the western terminus of US 30 Bus., at which point US 30 becomes a four-lane freeway that bypasses the borough of Bedford to the north. US 30 heads southeast and reaches a cloverleaf interchange with the US 220 freeway. The freeway crosses the Raystown Branch Juniata River and runs to the north of the river, passing over US 220 Bus. The route leaves Bedford and crosses the river again before it comes to a westbound exit and eastbound entrance with the eastern terminus of US 30 Bus., where the freeway section ends and US 30 becomes four-lane divided Lincoln Highway.

US 30, the Raystown Branch Juniata River, and the Pennsylvania Turnpike pass southeast through the Bedford Narrows, a gap in Evitts Mountain. Here, US 30 intersects the northern terminus of PA 326 and curves northeast, crossing over the river and under the turnpike. The route becomes a five-lane road with a center left-turn lane, curving east. The road turns into a four-lane divided highway and has interchanges with Pennknoll Road, where it passes south of UPMC Bedford hospital, and Lutzville Road. US 30 continues east and southeast and passes east through a gap in Tussey Mountain. The route has an eastbound exit and westbound entrance with the western terminus of US 30 Bus., where it becomes a freeway that bypasses the borough of Everett to the north. The freeway turns north between the mountain the west and Everett to the east before it turns east and passes over PA 26 prior to an interchange with the Bud Shuster Bypass that connects to PA 26. The freeway section of US 30 ends at an intersection with the eastern terminus of US 30 Bus. east of Everett, where US 30 becomes four-lane divided Lincoln Highway. The road curves southeast as it runs north of the Raystown Branch Juniata River. The route crosses the river and winds east, heading into the community of Breezewood, where it passes several businesses and comes to an at-grade intersection with I-70. At this point, I-70 joins US 30 in a wrong-way concurrency on a non–limited access section of Interstate Highway that has two eastbound lanes, three westbound lanes, and a center left-turn lane before the road comes to an interchange with the Pennsylvania Turnpike, where I-70 splits from US 30 and heads west along with I-76 on the turnpike. From here, US 30 narrows to a two-lane undivided road and crosses the Abandoned Pennsylvania Turnpike before it heads northeast into rural areas and climbs Rays Hill, gaining a second eastbound lane and passing over the Pennsylvania Turnpike (I-76).

Breezewood to Lancaster
At the summit of Rays Hill, US 30 enters Fulton County and descends the hill as two-lane undivided Lincoln Highway, with the Pennsylvania Turnpike parallel to the north. The route turns east away from the turnpike and comes to an intersection with PA 915, at which point PA 915 heads east for a concurrency with US 30. The road heads into the Buchanan State Forest, with PA 915 splitting to the north. US 30 ascends Sideling Hill and reaches the summit, where it comes to an eastbound truck brake check station. At this point, the road begins to descend Sideling Hill, winding east. Along the descent, the roadway comes to two truck brake check stations and two runaway truck ramps in the eastbound direction. The route leaves the state forest and heads southeast, passing through the community of Saluvia. US 30 curves east-southeast and comes to an intersection with PA 655 in the community of Harrisonville. The road turns southeast in the community of Breezy Point and ascends Scrub Ridge. The route comes to a westbound truck brake check station before it reaches the community of Summit, where it heads south to descend Scrub Ridge. US 30 continues south and briefly becomes a divided highway as it intersects Lincoln Way, where it turns into a two-lane expressway that bypasses the borough of McConnellsburg to the north. The road makes a hairpin turn to the northeast and gains a second westbound lane. The route curves east and comes to a diamond interchange with US 522 that serves McConnellsburg, where it becomes a four-lane divided expressway. Past this interchange, the expressway becomes a three-lane undivided road with two eastbound lanes and one westbound lane, turning to the south-southeast. US 30 becomes a divided highway and intersects Lincoln Way again, where the expressway section ends. The route becomes a three-lane undivided road with two eastbound lanes and one westbound lane as it ascends Tuscarora Mountain. The road narrows to two lanes as it continues to climb the mountain and follow a winding alignment.

At the summit of Tuscarora Mountain, US 30 enters Franklin County and curves northeast to descend the mountain. The road comes to an eastbound truck brake check station as it winds northeast and reaches an eastbound runaway truck ramp and gains a westbound truck lane. The route curves to the east-southeast and narrows to two lanes. At the bottom of the mountain, US 30 enters the Cumberland Valley and becomes Lincoln Way West, briefly turning into a divided highway as it reaches an intersection with PA 75. The road becomes undivided again and heads to the south of the community of Fort Loudon. The route continues east-northeast through rural areas in the valley, intersecting the northern terminus of PA 416 and passing through the community of St. Thomas. US 30 gains a center left-turn lane, crossing Back Creek. Farther east, the road has a junction with the northern terminus of PA 995 before it enters the borough of Chambersburg. At this point, the route runs through developed areas and splits into the one-way pair of West Loudon Street eastbound and Lincoln Way West westbound, with West Loudon Street a two-way, two-lane road and Lincoln Way West carrying two lanes of one-way traffic. US 30 crosses the Conococheague Creek and the Chambersburg Rail-Trail, with the eastbound direction shifting to West Queen Street, which carries two lanes of one-way traffic. The route heads into downtown Chambersburg and intersects US 11, which is routed on the one-way pair of Main Street southbound and 2nd Street northbound. Westbound US 30 meets southbound US 11 at Memorial Square, which features a fountain in the middle of the intersection. Upon crossing southbound US 11, US 30 becomes East Queen Street eastbound and Lincoln Way East westbound, crossing under Norfolk Southern's Lurgan Branch railroad line before both directions of US 30 rejoin on Lincoln Way East, a three-lane road with a center left-turn lane. The road runs east and passes south of WellSpan Chambersburg Hospital before it widens to five lanes as it comes to an interchange with I-81 on the eastern border of Chambersburg. Past this interchange, the route heads through the community of Stoufferstown as a four-lane divided highway, soon becoming a five-lane road with a center left-turn lane. US 30 narrows to three lanes as it continues through a mix of rural areas and development, passing south of the community of Fayetteville before it forms a short concurrency with PA 997 upon intersecting that route in the community of Greenwood. The road leaves the Cumberland Valley as it heads into the Michaux State Forest, where it crosses South Mountain. The route passes south of Caledonia State Park and becomes a three-lane road with two eastbound lanes and one westbound lane, crossing the Appalachian Trail. US 30 briefly becomes four lanes before it loses the second lane eastbound and intersects PA 233, where it turns into a three-lane road with a center left-turn lane.

US 30 enters Adams County and becomes Chambersburg Road, continuing east through Cashtown Gap in South Mountain. The road becomes three lanes with two eastbound lanes and one westbound lane before it turns back to a three-lane road with a center left-turn lane. The route intersects the western terminus of PA 234. US 30 continues east with one eastbound lane and two westbound lanes before narrowing to a two-lane road. The route curves southeast in the community of Hilltown and gains a center left-turn lane. The road passes through the community of McKnightstown, where it narrows to two lanes. US 30 crosses CSX's Hanover Subdivision railroad line at-grade in the community of Seven Stars. The route heads to the north of Gettysburg Regional Airport and passes through the community of Stremmels before it runs through a section of Gettysburg National Military Park. US 30 enters the borough of Gettysburg and becomes Buford Avenue, passing north of the United Lutheran Seminary as it heads into developed areas and turns east onto Chambersburg Street. The route continues into downtown Gettysburg and meets US 15 Bus./PA 116 at Lincoln Square, a traffic circle. At this point, US 30 heads east concurrent with PA 116 on York Street, with PA 116 splitting to the east and US 30 continuing northeast along York Street. The route leaves Gettysburg upon crossing Rock Creek and becomes York Road, a three-lane road with a center left-turn lane, with CSX's Hanover Subdivision parallel to the northwest. The road turns into a four-lane divided highway as it comes to an interchange with the US 15 freeway. US 30 continues east-northeast as a three-lane road with a center left-turn lane through a mix of rural areas and development, passing through the community of Guldens. The route curves east and briefly gains a second westbound lane before heading through the community of Brush Run. The road narrows to two lanes and crosses the South Branch Conewago Creek, where the name changes to Lincoln Way West. US 30 enters the borough of New Oxford, crossing CSX's Hanover Subdivision at-grade and meeting Carlisle Street/Hanover Street at the New Oxford Town Square, a traffic circle. The route becomes Lincoln Way East before it leaves New Oxford, where it turns into York Road and gains a center left-turn lane. The road crosses PA 94 in the community of Cross Keys and gains a second westbound lane further east before it reaches the borough of Abbottstown. Upon entering Abbottstown, US 30 becomes two-lane West King Street, meeting PA 194 at the Abbottstown Square traffic circle, before it continues along East King Street.

Upon crossing Beaver Creek, US 30 leaves Abbottstown and heads into York County. The route follows Lincoln Highway, a three-lane road with a center left-turn lane. The road curves to the northeast and passes through the community of Farmers, where it bends to the east-northeast. US 30 heads to the north of York Airport before it reaches the community of Thomasville, where it narrows to two lanes and crosses a York Railway line at-grade. The route gains a center left-turn lane and passes through more developed areas. The road widens to a four-lane divided highway and reaches an intersection with the eastern terminus of PA 116. US 30 heads east-northeast as West Market Street, a five-lane road with a center left-turn lane, and turns into a four-lane divided highway as it comes to a junction with the northern terminus of PA 616. Past this intersection, US 30 splits from West Market Street at a trumpet interchange by heading north onto a four-lane freeway, with PA 462 continuing east along West Market Street towards the city of York. The freeway passes over a York Railway line and curves northeast, passing under PA 234. The route continues northeast and comes to a diamond interchange with PA 74 in a business area north of the borough of West York, with the West Manchester Town Center shopping center located northwest of the interchange. US 30 widens to six lanes before the freeway section ends, with US 30 becoming a six-lane divided highway with at-grade intersections called Loucks Road that passes development. The road enters the city of York and curves east. The route leaves the city of York and crosses Susquehanna Trail/11th Avenue, where the name changes to Arsenal Road, before it reaches an intersection with I-83 Bus. and the southern terminus of PA 181 north of the borough of North York. US 30 comes to a partial cloverleaf interchange with I-83, where it narrows to four lanes, before it passes over Codorus Creek and the York County Heritage Rail Trail and then Norfolk Southern's York Secondary railroad line. The route continues east, turning into an unnamed four-lane freeway and reaching an interchange with Memory Lane that serves the community of East York. The freeway reaches a partial cloverleaf interchange with PA 24 south of the York Galleria shopping mall. US 30 continues east-northeast and passes north of the Haines Shoe House as it heads into rural areas, coming to a diamond interchange with Kreutz Creek Road that provides access to PA 462 and the borough of Hallam to the south. The freeway reaches a diamond interchange at Cool Springs Road, which heads south to connect to PA 462 and the borough of Wrightsville.

US 30 crosses the Susquehanna River on the Wright's Ferry Bridge into Lancaster County, where it heads into the borough of Columbia and passes over Norfolk Southern's Port Road Branch railroad line and the Northwest Lancaster County River Trail before coming to an interchange with PA 441 that serves Columbia; the Turkey Hill Experience is located south of this interchange. From here, the freeway heads northeast and curves to the southeast. The route leaves Columbia and turns east, coming to a diamond interchange with Prospect Road. US 30 passes through the borough of Mountville before it reaches a diamond interchange with Stony Battery Road that serves Mountville. The freeway runs east-northeast through suburban development, coming to a partial cloverleaf interchange with Centerville Road. The route turns northeast and crosses under PA 23. US 30 curves east as it reaches a diamond interchange with PA 741. The freeway widens to six lanes before it curves northeast and crosses the Little Conestoga Creek. The route comes to an interchange with Harrisburg Pike, at which point it enters the city of Lancaster and narrows to four lanes with an auxiliary lane in each direction, passing southeast of the Park City Center shopping mall that is served by the Harrisburg Pike interchange. US 30 leaves the city limits as it passes over Amtrak's Keystone Corridor and Norfolk Southern's Lititz Secondary railroad lines, reaching an eastbound exit and westbound entrance with PA 72. The route comes to an interchange with the eastern terminus of the PA 283 freeway. At this point, the US 30 freeway widens to six lanes and turns east as it becomes paralleled by a pair of frontage roads called Chester Road eastbound and York Road westbound. The frontage roads serve the interchanges at Fruitville Pike, PA 501, and US 222/PA 272 to the north of Lancaster. Past the US 222/PA 272 interchange, the frontage roads end and US 222 heads east concurrent with US 30 on the freeway before US 222 splits northeast on a freeway at a trumpet interchange. From here, US 30 continues southeast as a four-lane freeway with an auxiliary lane in each direction, coming to a diamond interchange with PA 23 at New Holland Pike. At this point, PA 23 joins US 30 in a wrong-way concurrency, with the freeway crossing the Conestoga River before PA 23 splits to the southwest at a partial cloverleaf interchange. US 30 runs through a section of the city of Lancaster before it meets Greenfield Road at a partial cloverleaf interchange; Greenfield Road provides access to the Discover Lancaster Visitors Center. The freeway curves to the south-southeast, passing over Norfolk Southern's New Holland Secondary and Amtrak's Keystone Corridor railroad lines before coming to a partial interchange with PA 340 that has no westbound exit. US 30 continues as a four-lane freeway with an eastbound auxiliary lane before the freeway section ends at an interchange with the eastern terminus of PA 462 to the east of Lancaster.

Lancaster to New Jersey

Past the interchange with the eastern terminus of PA 462, US 30 heads east-southeast along Lincoln Highway, a five-lane road with a center left-turn lane, passing through the community of Greenland. The route heads into the Pennsylvania Dutch Country of eastern Lancaster County and is lined with many Amish tourist attractions. The road crosses Mill Creek and heads north of the Tanger Outlets Lancaster outlet mall and south of the Dutch Wonderland amusement park. US 30 passes south of the American Music Theatre and runs between two shopping centers before it reaches an intersection with PA 896. Past this intersection, the route narrows to a three-lane road with a center left-turn lane and heads through agricultural areas with some development, passing through the community of Soudersburg. US 30 crosses the Pequea Creek and runs through the community of Paradise before it comes to a bridge over Amtrak's Keystone Corridor railroad line. From here, the route continues east-southeast a short distance to the north of the Amtrak line. The road closely parallels the railroad tracks as it heads through the community of Kinzers. The Amtrak line diverges to the south east of here. The route splits into a one-way pair, with two lanes in each direction, as it reaches the community of Gap and comes to an intersection with the eastern terminus of PA 772. US 30 continues along the one-way pair, with both directions rejoining at a junction with the northern terminus of PA 41. Past the PA 41 junction, the route is a four-lane divided highway that soon turns into a three-lane road with a center left-turn lane, intersecting the southern terminus of PA 897. The road leaves Gap and turns into a three-lane road two eastbound lanes and one westbound lane as it ascends a hill. Farther east, the route becomes three lanes with a center left-turn lane.

US 30 enters Chester County and continues east along Lincoln Highway, passing through the community of Black Horse. The route turns into a four-lane undivided road and comes to an intersection with PA 10 north of the borough of Parkesburg, where it becomes a divided highway. US 30 splits from Lincoln Highway at an eastbound exit and westbound entrance by heading onto a four-lane freeway called the Coatesville Downingtown Bypass, with US 30 Bus. continuing east along Lincoln Highway. The freeway heads east, crossing Buck Run and coming to a westbound exit and eastbound entrance with Airport Road that provides access to Chester County G. O. Carlson Airport. Following this, the route runs east-northeast through a mix of rural areas and suburban development. US 30 heads into the city of Coatesville and crosses the West Branch Brandywine Creek before it comes to a partial cloverleaf interchange with PA 82 that provides access to Coatesville. Past this interchange, the freeway leaves the city limits of Coatesville and passes under PA 340 before reaching an interchange with Reeceville Road. The route curves east-southeast and crosses under PA 340 again before running east and coming to a diamond interchange with PA 340 north of the community of Thorndale. US 30 heads east-northeast and reaches a partial cloverleaf interchange with US 322 that serves the borough of Downingtown. Farther east, the freeway passes over PA 282 and the East Branch Brandywine Creek before it comes to a bridge over the Struble Trail and enters a section of Downingtown, reaching a westbound exit and eastbound entrance with Norwood Road that provides access to PA 282. The route widens to six lanes and heads near suburban development before it comes to an eastbound exit and westbound entrance with PA 113, at which point it leaves the borough limits of Downingtown and narrows back to four lanes. US 30 curves southeast and reaches an interchange with US 30 Bus. Past this interchange, the name of the freeway changes to Exton Bypass. The route turns northeast and runs parallel to Amtrak's Keystone Corridor railroad line to the south of the road. US 30 comes to a partial cloverleaf interchange with PA 100 that serves the community of Exton to the north. Following this, the freeway continues east-northeast parallel to the Amtrak line. US 30 comes to an interchange with the US 202 freeway and the eastern terminus of US 30 Bus., at which point the freeway section ends. The Exton Bypass portion of US 30 is designated the Exton Bypass Scenic Byway, a Pennsylvania Scenic Byway.

Past the interchange with US 202 and US 30 Bus., US 30 heads east-northeast along four-lane divided Lincoln Highway and passes south of a park and ride lot, running through the community of Glenloch. The route soon becomes Lancaster Avenue, a three-lane road with a center left-turn lane. In the community of Frazer, the road comes to an intersection with the northern terminus of PA 352. Farther east, US 30 widens to five lanes with a center turn lane before it reaches a junction with the eastern terminus of PA 401. The route turns into a four-lane divided highway prior to intersecting the southern terminus of PA 29. Past this intersection, the road crosses under Norfolk Southern's Dale Secondary railroad line and continues east as it runs north of the borough of Malvern, becoming undivided. US 30 briefly gains a center left-turn lane before it becomes a divided highway again as it passes south of Paoli Hospital prior to crossing under Amtrak's Keystone Corridor railroad line to the north of the community of Green Tree. At this point, the route enters an area of suburbs called the Philadelphia Main Line as it heads into the community of Paoli, becoming a four-lane undivided road. In the center of Paoli, the road has a junction with Paoli Pike before it passes south of the Paoli station serving Amtrak's Keystone Corridor and SEPTA's Paoli/Thorndale Line. US 30 gains a center left-turn lane and reaches an intersection with PA 252. Following this intersection, the route runs south of the parallel Amtrak line, passing south of the Daylesford SEPTA station in the community of Daylesford. The road loses the center turn lane and runs further south but still parallel to the railroad tracks, turning northeast. US 30 reaches the community of Berwyn, where it passes south of the Berwyn SEPTA station and curves east and then southeast, gaining a center left-turn lane. The route turns to the northeast and reaches the community of Devon, where it drops the center turn lane and runs south of the Devon SEPTA station before passing to the north of the Devon Horse Show grounds. Past Devon, the road bends to the east-southeast.

Upon intersecting Old Eagle School Road/Sugartown Road, US 30 enters Delaware County and continues east-southeast along four-lane undivided Lancaster Avenue, curving east and running through the downtown area of the community of Wayne. The route passes through the community of St. Davids and turns southeast. East of here, the road becomes a divided highway before turning undivided again. US 30 briefly becomes a divided highway again as it curves east and reaches an interchange with I-476. Past this interchange, the route turns back into an undivided road and crosses under SEPTA's Norristown High Speed Line before coming to an intersection with PA 320 in the community of Villanova. Following this intersection, the road runs through the Villanova University campus, passing south of St. Thomas of Villanova Church, and curves southeast prior to the Ithan Avenue intersection, where it heads to the south of Villanova Stadium and the Finneran Pavilion arena. After passing through the university campus, US 30 runs through the community of Rosemont. Upon intersecting County Line Road, the route enters Montgomery County and heads into the community of Bryn Mawr, passing through the downtown area. The road continues southeast and briefly re-enters Delaware County before heading back into Montgomery County. US 30 passes through the community of Haverford, where it heads north of the Haverford School. The route continues into the community of Ardmore and runs through the community's downtown area, passing south of the Ardmore station serving Amtrak's Keystone Corridor and SEPTA's Paoli/Thorndale Line. Past Ardmore, the road heads through the community of Wynnewood. The route runs southeast before it crosses the East Branch Indian Creek and passes between the St. Charles Borromeo Seminary to the northeast and Lankenau Medical Center to the southwest as a five-lane road with a center left-turn lane prior to reaching an intersection with US 1 (City Avenue).

Upon crossing US 1, US 30 enters the city of Philadelphia in Philadelphia County and continues southeast along two-lane undivided Lancaster Avenue through the Overbrook neighborhood. At the intersection with 62nd Street/Malvern Avenue, the route passes north of the 63rd and Malvern Loop that serves as the terminus of SEPTA's Route 10 trolley line and heads into urban areas of West Philadelphia a short distance to the south of Amtrak's Keystone Corridor railroad line, running north of Overbrook High School after the 59th Street intersection. Farther southeast, a SEPTA trolley track follows the westbound lanes past the 54th Street junction. At the intersection with 52nd Street/Lansdowne Avenue, US 30 heads further south from the Amtrak tracks and SEPTA's Route 10 trolley line begins following the road. The route splits from Lancaster Avenue by turning east onto Girard Avenue, which carries two lanes of traffic and SEPTA's Route 15 trolley line. The road runs east and crosses over Amtrak's Keystone Corridor railroad line at the Belmont Avenue intersection before widening to four lanes. Farther east, US 30 passes over CSX's Harrisburg Subdivision railroad line before it comes to an interchange with I-76 (Schuylkill Expressway) and US 13 to the north of the Philadelphia Zoo, crossing under the Pennsylvania Railroad, Connecting Railway Bridge carrying Amtrak's Northeast Corridor railroad line at this interchange. At this interchange, US 13 heads south along 34th Street and continues east (north) along the Girard Avenue Bridge over the Schuylkill River while US 30 becomes concurrent with I-76 on the six-lane Schuylkill Expressway at this point and the road heads south, with the Philadelphia Zoo to the west and Martin Luther King Jr. Drive, the Schuylkill River Trail, and the Schuylkill River parallel to the east. The freeway turns southeast and runs between Amtrak's Northeast Corridor to the southwest and the river drive, trail, and river to the northeast, with Boathouse Row on the opposite bank of the river. The Schuylkill Expressway comes to an eastbound exit and westbound entrance with Spring Garden Street, which heads east across the Schuylkill River toward the Philadelphia Museum of Art. The freeway continues south, heading east of Amtrak's Penn Coach Yard, and comes to an interchange with the western terminus of I-676.

At this point, US 30 heads east concurrent with I-676 on the six-lane Vine Street Expressway. It immediately crosses the Schuylkill River and then the Schuylkill River Trail and CSX's Philadelphia Subdivision railroad line on the river's east bank on the Vine Street Expressway Bridge before coming to an interchange with 23rd Street and 22nd Street and the Benjamin Franklin Parkway that has access to the Philadelphia Museum of Art and the Franklin Institute science museum. From this point, the Vine Street Expressway enters a depressed road cut and passes under several streets, running along the northern edge of Center City Philadelphia.  Vine Street serves as a street-level frontage road to the freeway. Within this alignment, there is an exit for PA 611 (Broad Street). After passing under 10th Street in Chinatown, the last street the depressed alignment passes under, the highway rises up and reaches a split between the Vine Street Expressway, which continues to I-95, and I-676/US 30. At this split, there is also an eastbound exit and westbound entrance for 8th Street. After exiting the Vine Street Expressway, eastbound I-676/US 30 has a brief at-grade portion along southbound 6th Street to the Benjamin Franklin Bridge approach, an example of a non–limited access section of Interstate Highway. Westbound I-676/US 30 has a ramp from the bridge to the Vine Street Expressway that intersects 7th Street and 8th Street at-grade. From this point, I-676/US 30 crosses over I-95, Christopher Columbus Boulevard, and then the Delaware River into New Jersey on the seven-lane Benjamin Franklin Bridge, which also carries pedestrians and the PATCO Speedline. This bridge and its approaches are maintained by the Delaware River Port Authority.

History

The path of the Lincoln Highway was first laid out in September 1913; it was defined to run through Canton, Ohio; Beaver; Pittsburgh; Greensburg; Ligonier; Bedford; Chambersburg; Gettysburg; York; Lancaster; and Philadelphia, Pennsylvania; and Camden, New Jersey. This bypassed Harrisburg to the south, and thus did not use the older main route across the state between Chambersburg and Lancaster. From Pittsburgh to Philadelphia, this incorporated a number of old turnpikes, some of which still collected tolls:
Part of the Harrisburg and Pittsburgh Turnpike, chartered in 1806, broken up in 1814 into separate turnpike companies, of which the following were included:
Greensburg and Pittsburgh Turnpike, Pittsburgh to Greensburg
Somerset and Greensburg Turnpike (renamed the Stoystown and Greensburg Turnpike 1815), Greensburg to Stoystown
Bedford and Somerset Turnpike (renamed the Bedford and Stoystown Turnpike 1815), Stoystown to Bedford
Chambersburg and Bedford Turnpike, Bedford to Chambersburg
Chambersburg Turnpike, Chambersburg to Cashtown
Part of the Gettysburg and Petersburg Turnpike, from Cashtown to Gettysburg
York and Gettysburg Turnpike, Gettysburg to York
Wrightsville Turnpike, York to Wrightsville
 Columbia-Wrightsville Bridge, Wrightsville to Columbia
Lancaster and Susquehanna Turnpike, Columbia to Lancaster
 Philadelphia and Lancaster Turnpike, Lancaster to Philadelphia

This original 1913 path of the Lincoln Highway continued east from Philadelphia, crossing the Delaware River to Camden, New Jersey, on the Market Street Ferry. The city of Philadelphia marked the route from the ferry landing west on Market Street through downtown and onto Lancaster Avenue to the Philadelphia and Lancaster Turnpike in early 1914. By 1915 Camden was dropped from the route, allowing the highway to cross the Delaware on a bridge at Trenton, New Jersey (initially the Calhoun Street Bridge, later the Bridge Street Bridge).

In 1924, the entire Lincoln Highway in Pennsylvania was designated Pennsylvania Route 1 (PA 1). In late 1926 the route from West Virginia to Philadelphia (using the new route west of Pittsburgh) was assigned US 30, while the rest of the Lincoln Highway and PA 1 became part of US 1. The PA 1 designation was gone by 1929, but several branches from east to west – PA 101, PA 201, PA 301, PA 401, PA 501 and PA 601 – had been assigned by then. (PA 701 was assigned later as a branch of PA 101.)

Ohio to Downtown Pittsburgh

As defined in 1913, the Lincoln Highway ran east-northeast from Canton, Ohio, to Alliance and east via Salem, crossing into Pennsylvania just east of East Palestine. From there it continued southeasterly to Beaver, crossing the Beaver River there and heading south along its left bank to Rochester and the Ohio River's right bank to Pittsburgh.

By 1915, the highway had been realigned to the route it would follow until the end of 1927. It ran east from Canton, Ohio to Lisbon and then southeast to East Liverpool on the Ohio River. After crossing into Pennsylvania, it turned north away from the river at Smiths Ferry, taking an inland route to Beaver, where it rejoined the Ohio River. It crossed the Beaver River into Rochester, joining the 1913 alignment, and turned south with the Ohio to Pittsburgh.

1915 route
This route entered Pennsylvania along PA Route 68. After crossing Little Beaver Creek, it turned south on Main Street, passing under the Cleveland and Pittsburgh Railroad (PRR) into Glasgow. After passing through that community on Liberty Street, the highway turned north and passed under the railroad again at Smiths Ferry, merging with Smiths Ferry Road. This alignment through Glasgow carried the Lincoln Highway until ca. 1926, when the present PA 68 was built on the north side of the railroad.

The Lincoln Highway left the banks of the Ohio River on Smiths Ferry Road, which includes an old stone bridge over Upper Dry Run. It turned east on Tuscarawas Road through Ohioville, entering Beaver on Fourth Street and turning south on Buffalo Street to reach Third Street (PA Route 68). By 1929 this inland Glasgow-Beaver route was numbered PA Route 168, while the route along the river, never followed by the Lincoln Highway, was PA 68.

Where PA 68 crosses the Pittsburgh and Lake Erie Railroad from Beaver into Bridgewater along Third Street and then the Beaver River on the ca. 1963 Rochester-Bridgewater Bridge, the Lincoln Highway instead ran along Bridge Street, just to the north, and crossed the Old Rochester-Bridgewater Bridge into Rochester.

Continuing through Rochester to Pittsburgh, the Lincoln Highway left the Old Rochester-Bridgewater Bridge on Madison Street, turning onto Brighton Avenue, and then crossing the Pittsburgh, Fort Wayne and Chicago Railway (PRR) on New York Avenue. After running alongside the Ohio River on Railroad Avenue, the highway crossed the railroad again in Freedom (about a block north of Third Street), running through Freedom on Third Avenue.

South of downtown Freedom, Third Avenue merges into the Ohio River Boulevard, also known as PA Route 65, which runs along the old Lincoln Highway into Conway. There the old highway went onto First Avenue and State Street, rejoining PA 65 in Baden. Further into Baden, the old highway left PA 65 again, onto State Street, becoming Duss Avenue in Harmony Township. At the Ambridge limits, this becomes PA Route 989, but the old highway turned west at 14th Street and then south on Merchant Street.

Crossing Big Sewickley Creek from Ambridge, Beaver County into Leetsdale, Allegheny County, Merchant Street becomes Beaver Street, a brick road. Beaver Road and Beaver Street continues through Edgeworth, Sewickley, and Osborne, merging back into PA 65 at the border with Haysville. Sewickley officially changed the name of its piece to Lincoln Highway by an ordinance in January 1916, and Osborne, Edgeworth and Leetsdale soon followed suit, but that name is no longer used.

In Glenfield, the highway crossed the Pittsburgh, Fort Wayne and Chicago Railway twice, once near the present overpass and again west of Toms Run Road. The old road next to the Ohio River, Beaver Street, is still a yellow brick road but now used only by local traffic.

The old road left PA 65 again in Emsworth as Beaver Road, becoming Brighton Road in Ben Avon before re-merging with PA 65. It splits yet again, also in Ben Avon, onto Brighton Road, another yellow brick road. In Avalon it is California Avenue, and in Bellevue it is Lincoln Avenue, coincidentally named after Lincoln soon after the U.S. Civil War.

The highway crosses into Pittsburgh on a high concrete arch bridge over Jack's Run, built in 1924 to replace an earlier bridge built for a streetcar line, and returns to the California Avenue name. It crosses Woods Run on a similar 1928 bridge next to a newer bridge built for the Ohio River Boulevard (PA Route 65). Where California Avenue curves away from PA 65, the Lincoln Highway continued next to it on Chateau Street, turning east on Western Avenue and then south on Galveston Avenue onto the 1915 Manchester Bridge to the Point.

During the time that the Lincoln Highway ran through Rochester, the Rochester-Pittsburgh segment was locally maintained. It was often foggy, and a July 1926 Lincoln Highway Association road report states that it was "paved city streets, mostly poor", in stark contrast to the good paving east of Pittsburgh. By 1924, reports recommended following an alternate on the other side of the river between Rochester and Pittsburgh. The route west of Rochester had similar problems; it was a dirt road, despite being a state highway. By 1922 an official detour was recommended via East Palestine, Ohio and Beaver, largely identical to the initial 1913 plan.

1927 route
Work began in the mid-1920s on a new route to the south of the existing route, passing through West Virginia and bypassing the problematic sections on both sides of Rochester; the Lincoln Highway was moved to it December 2, 1927. This new route had already been numbered U.S. 30 in late 1926.

The new Lincoln Highway bypassed the community of Imperial on a bypass built for it. Just southeast of Imperial, the highway turned east on Steubenville Pike, joining what was U.S. Route 22 before the present U.S. 22/U.S. 30 freeway was built ca. 1964. Steubenville Pike runs along the north side of the freeway, crossing to the south side and then merging with it just west of the I-376 interchange. From the late 1940s to 1982, the appropriately-named Penn-Lincoln Drive-In Theater operated on a stretch of the original Lincoln Highway in North Fayette, just east of Imperial. It reopened for one season in 1985 as the Super 30 West Drive-In. The site is now occupied by Penn-Lincoln Shopping Center.

US 22 and US 30 now join I-376 and turn southeast, but the Lincoln Highway (and US 22/30 before the nearby part of what is now I-376 opened in 1953) continued east with PA 60 through Robinson Township. In 1950, the Twin Hi-Way Drive-In Theater opened along the Robinson Township stretch, its name derived from the road's former designation of dual U.S. Route 22/30. Through Crafton, the highway used Steuben Street, Noble Avenue, Dinsmore Avenue, and Crafton Boulevard, now northbound PA 60. In Pittsburgh, the highway ran along Crafton Boulevard, Noblestown Road, and South Main Street, as PA 60 still does. It turned onto Carson Street (now PA Route 837) at the West End Circle, crossing the 1927 Point Bridge into the Point.

Downtown Pittsburgh to North Huntingdon

From 1915 to late 1927, the Lincoln Highway crossed the Allegheny River on the Manchester Bridge to the Point, touching down at the foot of Penn Avenue after meeting the Point Bridge. It made its way through downtown to Bigelow Boulevard (now PA Route 380), using Water Street, Liberty Avenue and Oliver Avenue. It continued to follow present PA 380 onto Craig Street and Baum Boulevard to East Liberty. The highway left East Liberty and Pittsburgh on Penn Avenue, the old Pittsburgh and Greensburg Turnpike, also now part of PA 380, and further east part of PA Route 8. (PA 380 however bypasses the center of East Liberty.)

The Boulevard of the Allies opened east from downtown Pittsburgh in 1923, and in 1924 it was designated as an alternate route. By 1930, this bypass ran along the Boulevard of the Allies, Forbes Avenue, Beeler Street, Wilkins Avenue and Dallas Avenue, rejoining the Lincoln Highway at Penn Avenue, west of Wilkinsburg.

Leaving the Pittsburgh area, the Lincoln Highway turned onto Ardmore Boulevard (now signed as PA 8 north of I-376, and U.S. 30 south of I-376). It then branched away from Ardmore Boulevard along Electric Avenue, turned northeast on Braddock Avenue, then east on Penn Avenue. The Lincoln Highway originally continued onto Airbrake Avenue and then turned south at 11th Street to cross Turtle Creek and the Pennsylvania Railroad main line over a bridge; a 1925 replacement bridge starts at the intersection of Airbrake Avenue, Penn Avenue, Monroeville Avenue, and Greensburg Pike. The Lincoln Highway then followed Greensburg Pike up to current U.S. 30.

In 1932, a bypass of the grades into and out of Turtle Creek, including the George Westinghouse Bridge, was opened. It runs along current U.S. 30 from the interchange with Electric Avenue in Chalfant to the intersection with Greensburg Pike in North Versailles.

The borough of White Oak had named their main street Lincoln Way in an attempt to convince the Lincoln Highway Association to use it, but instead the highway continued along Greensburg Pike through North Versailles.

Later history

The Penn-Lincoln Parkway was built from 1953 to 1962 as a freeway bypass across the Pittsburgh area for both the Lincoln Highway (US 30) and the William Penn Highway (US 22).

In 1953, the portion of present-day US 30 between PA 283 in Lancaster and PA 462 east of Lancaster was built as a freeway alignment of US 230. In 1967, US 30 was shifted to a freeway bypass between Prospect Road east of Columbia and east of Lancaster; the route replaced the US 230 designation between the present-day PA 283 and PA 462 interchanges. PA 462 was designated onto the former alignment of US 30 between those two points. In 1972, US 30 was shifted to a bypass between west of York and Columbia, with PA 462 extended west along the former alignment of US 30.

In 1963, the freeway bypass of US 30 between east of PA 10 and east of Downingtown was completed, with US 30 Bus. designated onto the former alignment of US 30. In December 1995, the US 30 freeway was extended east to bypass Exton, ending at an interchange with the US 202 freeway. As a result, US 30 Bus. was extended east through Exton along the former alignment of US 30 to its current eastern terminus.

From 1997 to 2004 significant construction was completed to the US 30 bypass around Lancaster.

A bypass of the section of US 30 in Gap, in Lancaster County, was first proposed in February 2012. In 2015, a PennDOT project began to build a bypass to the north of Gap for westbound US 30 between the PA 772 and PA 41 intersections to improve traffic flow and safety at the congested intersection of US 30 and PA 41. The bypass, which cost $10 million, was opened on August 4, 2016.

On April 7, 2018, a section of US 30 in East Pittsburgh sank  down a hill after a landslide. One apartment building was destroyed, another threatened and ultimately demolished. The damaged road section reopened in late June 2018.

There are plans for improvements to be made to the US 30 freeway bypassing Coatesville and Downingtown in Chester County. The project is split into a western section between PA 10 near Parkesburg and PA 82 in Coatesville and an eastern section between Reeceville Road near Coatesville and US 30 Bus. east of Downingtown. The western section will remain four lanes wide, with construction planned to begin in 2026. The eastern section is planned to be widened to six lanes, with construction beginning as early as 2028. In addition to improvements made to the freeway, interchanges will also be improved. Construction of the western section is projected to cost $355 million while the eastern section is projected to cost $460 million.

Major intersections

See also

References

External links

Pennsylvania Highways: US 30
US 30 at AARoads.com
Pennsylvania Roads – US 30
The Roads of Metro Philadelphia: US 30 Expressway (Chester County Section)
The Roads of Metro Philadelphia: Vine Street Expressway (I-676/US 30)
James Lin, The Lincoln Highway: Pennsylvania
Lincoln Highway maps ca. 1926, New York to Pittsburgh

Pennsylvania
30
Transportation in Beaver County, Pennsylvania
Transportation in Allegheny County, Pennsylvania
Transportation in Pittsburgh
Transportation in Westmoreland County, Pennsylvania
Transportation in Somerset County, Pennsylvania
Transportation in Bedford County, Pennsylvania
Transportation in Fulton County, Pennsylvania
Transportation in Franklin County, Pennsylvania
Transportation in Adams County, Pennsylvania
Transportation in York County, Pennsylvania
Transportation in Lancaster County, Pennsylvania
Transportation in Chester County, Pennsylvania
Radnor Township, Delaware County, Pennsylvania
Transportation in Montgomery County, Pennsylvania
Transportation in Philadelphia
U.S. Route 030 in Pennsylvania
Delaware River Port Authority